João Leitão Gonçalves Manuel (born 28 May 1994) is a Portuguese footballer who plays for 1º Dezembro as a goalkeeper.

Football career
On 4 May 2014, Manuel made his professional debut with Estoril Praia in a 2013–14 Primeira Liga match against Belenenses.

References

External links

Stats and profile at LPFP 

1994 births
People from Oeiras, Portugal
Living people
Portuguese footballers
Association football goalkeepers
G.D. Estoril Praia players
Primeira Liga players
Atlético Clube de Portugal players
Liga Portugal 2 players
C.R. Caála players
Portuguese expatriate footballers
Expatriate footballers in Angola
Sertanense F.C. players
Sportspeople from Lisbon District